Kamil Włodyka (born 11 October 1994) is a Polish professional footballer who plays as a right winger for Pogoń Siedlce.

Career

Garbarnia Kraków
On 3 January 2019, Włodyka joined Garbarnia Kraków for one year.

References

External links
 
 

Living people
1994 births
Polish footballers
Poland youth international footballers
Association football midfielders
Szczakowianka Jaworzno players
Ruch Chorzów players
Gryf Wejherowo players
Garbarnia Kraków players
Kotwica Kołobrzeg footballers
Elana Toruń players
MKP Pogoń Siedlce players
Ekstraklasa players
I liga players
II liga players
III liga players
People from Jaworzno
Sportspeople from Silesian Voivodeship